Dynamo Palace of Sports is an indoor sporting arena located in Khovrino District, Moscow, Russia. The capacity of the arena is 5,000. It was built during the preparations for the 1980 Summer Olympics, hosted by Moscow, USSR and was used as a venue of the handball tournament there.

It was the home venue of Dynamo Moscow basketball team until 2006. The Dynamo Moscow volleyball team currently play their home matches here.

See also 
Dynamo (disambiguation)

References

External links

Official site

Indoor arenas built in the Soviet Union
Indoor arenas in Russia
Sports venue
Defunct basketball venues
Sports venues in Moscow
Handball venues in Russia
Venues of the 1980 Summer Olympics
Olympic handball venues
Venues of the Friendship Games